Uroševina is a village in the municipality of Mojkovac, Montenegro.

Demographics
According to the 2011 census, its population was 435.

References

Populated places in Mojkovac Municipality